Frank Asumah Abdulai Ayariga was the first Member of Parliament for Bawku during the Third Republic of Ghana.

Politics
Ayariga was a member of the People's National Party which was also formed the government in power between 1979 and 1981. Following the overthrow of Hilla Limann's government by the Jerry Rawlings-led Provisional National Defence Council on 31 December 1981, Ayariga left for exile in Nigeria. He stayed there for six years, only returning to Ghana in 1987 after he had been cleared of corruption.

Family
Ayariga's family hails from Tinsungo in Bawku in the Upper East Region of Ghana. He was also a member of the Kusasi Royal Family. He was married to Anatu Ayariga. He had eleven children.

His third child, Hassan Ayariga was the presidential candidate for the People's National Convention in the Ghanaian presidential election in December 2012.  Mahama Ayariga, a younger son of his 2nd Wife is the MP for Bawku and a former Deputy Minister of Trade and Industry and later Education.

See also
 MPs elected in the Ghanaian parliamentary election, 1979

References

Year of birth unknown
Year of death unknown
People's National Party (Ghana) politicians
Ghanaian MPs 1979–1981
20th-century Ghanaian people